Frida 1967–1972 is a compilation album by Swedish singer Anni-Frid Lyngstad, released in 1997 by EMI Sweden. The album features Lyngstad's anthology of her solo recordings prior to ABBA, which includes the A and B sides of ten 7" singles, and rare television and radio performances from this period, as well as her debut album, Frida.

History
On 3 September 1967, Frida won the national Swedish song contest named "New Faces", arranged by record company EMI and held at Skansen, Stockholm. The first prize was a recording contract with EMI Sweden. A secret for the winner, not known to Frida, was to perform the song live in a major TV show the same evening. This happened on the same day Sweden went from driving on the left hand to the right hand. That Sunday evening, September 1967, Frida sang her winning song "En Ledig Dag", (A Free Day or A Day Off) in the TV show. This very first exposure to a wider TV-audience caused a big sensation and so many record companies and composers got in touch with Frida, EMI started to fear they might lose their new singer. To be sure, on the next morning, EMI drove all the way from Stockholm to the town Eskilstuna and ended up in Frida's home with the recording contract for her to sign. EMI producer Olle Bergman said that "We got so interested and fond of her, and I thought she had everything a person needs to become something".

During these early years, Lyngstad did many other radio and TV recordings in Sweden. Various performances can be found in Frida – The DVD but they are not included in this set. She spent five years at EMI Sweden before switching to the Polar Music label and joining her bandmates in ABBA in 1972. Her first TV-performance, mentioned above, is included in her documentary DVD.

On 11 September 1967, Frida went into Europa Film Studio  in Stockholm and recorded "En Ledig Dag". Professional and self-assured on this first day in the studio, she managed to record the vocals for the song in just one take. The same day, she also recorded the B-side, "Peter Kom Tillbaka", (Peter Come Back).  Among all the songs here is her 1969 attempt in the Swedish for the Eurovision Song Contest  with "Härlig Är Vår Jord" (Our Earth Is Wonderful) when she finished fourth. Her first studio album, "Frida", was also included in this compilation, which was produced by her then fiancé Benny Andersson, as well as her first #1 hit in Sweden with "Min Egen Stad", (My Own Town) in the Svensktoppen chart. (This song includes 3 of the 4 Abba members: Björn Ulvaeus, Benny on piano, and Frida).

This release also includes clips from the press and critics from the time the songs and album were first released. Frida received unanimously generous praise from the critics, who especially noted the precision and versatility of Frida as a vocalist, hitting every note to perfection. The box set contains pictures of all the singles releases, and alternative photo shots which were never seen before. The bonus tracks on this compilation were recorded for TV.

The Frida 1967-1972 compilation saw the CD debut of the rare duet single "En Kväll Om Sommar'n"/"Vi Vet Allt Men Nästan Inget", (One Summer Evening/We Know Everything But Almost Nothing) with Lars Berghagen, recorded in the spring of 1971 to promote a Swedish summer tour in the folkparks, originally released on the Polydor label.

The live version of "Barnen Sover", (The Children Are Sleeping) was recorded on 29 September 1970 for radio show, Våra Favoriter (Our Favourites). This was the very first public appearance of Anni-Frid Lyngstad, Agnetha Fältskog, Björn Ulvaeus and Benny Andersson as a quartet, shortly before their 'Festfolket' tour.

Track listing

CD 1
"En Ledig Dag" ("Weekend in Portofino") (Matteo Chiosso, Bruno Defilippi, Bengt Sten) - 2:55
"Peter Kom Tillbaka" ("Junge, Komm Bald Wieder") (Lotar Olias, Olle Bergman) - 3:07
"Din" ("Quiereme Mucho") (Gonzalo Roig, Jerico) - 2:39
"Du Är Så Underbart Rar" ("Can't Take My Eyes Off You") (Bob Crewe, Bob Gaudio, B.S. Bimen) - 3:17
"Simsalabim" (Gunnar Sandevärn) - 2:30
"Vi Möts Igen" ("Where Are They Now?") (Bradford Craig, Ty Whitney, Bengt Haslum) - 3:18
"Mycket Kär" ("Non illuderti mai") (Daniele Pace, Mario Panzeri, Lorenzo Pilat, Stikkan Anderson) - 2:25
"När Du Blir Min" ("The Lonesome Road") (Nat Shilkret, Olle Bergman) - 2:09
"Härlig Är Vår Jord" (Ivan Renliden) - 2:42
"Räkna De Lyckliga Stunderna Blott" (Jules Sylvain, Karl-Ewert) - 2:38
"Så Synd Du Måste Gå" ("Comment te dire adieu?"/"It Hurts To Say Goodbye") (Jack Gold, Arnold Golan, Stikkan Anderson) - 2:24
"Försök Och Sov På Saken" ("Surround Yourself with Sorrow") (Bill Martin, Phil Coulter, Bo-Göran Edling) - 2:40
"Peter Pan" (Benny Andersson, Björn Ulvaeus) - 2:09
"Du Betonar Kärlek Lite Fel" (Peter Himmelstrand) - 2:29
"Där Du Går Lämnar Kärleken Spår" ("Love Grows (Where My Rosemary Goes)") (Barry Mason, Tony Macaulay, Olle Bergman) - 2:43
"Du Var Främling Här Igår" ("I Close My Eyes And Count To Ten") (Clive Westlake, Patrice Hellberg) - 3:32
"Tre Kvart Från Nu" (Melody in F) (Anton Rubinstein, Peter Himmelstrand) - 3:14
"Jag Blir Galen När Jag Tänker På Dej" ("Goin' Out of My Head") (Teddy Randazzo, Robert Weinstein, Stikkan Anderson) - 3:27
"Lycka" (Björn Ulvaeus, Benny Andersson, Stikkan Andersson) - 2:59
"Sen Dess Har Jag Inte Sett 'En" (Trad. arr. Claes Rosendahl, Lars Berghagen) - 2:10

CD 2
"En Ton Av Tystnad" ("The Sound of Silence") (Paul Simon, Owe Junsjö) - 3:58
"Suzanne" (Leonard Cohen, Owe Junsjö) - 4:07
"Allting Skall Bli Bra" / "Vad Gör Jag Med Min Kärlek?" ("Everything's Alright"/"I Don't Know How to Love Him" from Jesus Christ Superstar) (Tim Rice, Andrew Lloyd Webber, Owe Junsjö) - 6:14
"Jag Är Beredd"  ("And I'll Be There") (Paul Leka, Denise Gross, Stikkan Anderson)  - 2:38
"En Liten Sång Om Kärlek" ("Five Pennies Saints") (Sylvia Fine, Lars Berghagen) - 2:25
"Telegram Till Fullmånen" (Cornelis Vreeswijk, Georg Riedel) - 1:59
"Barnen Sover" (Peter Himmelstrand) - 3:35
"En Kväll Om Sommar'n" (duet with Lars Berghagen) ("Changes") (Phil Ochs, Lars Berghagen) - 2:08
"Vi Vet Allt, Men Nästan Inget" (duet with Lars Berghagen) (Lars Berghagen) - 3:32
"Min Egen Stad" (Benny Andersson, Peter Himmelstrand) - 3:00
"En Gång Är Ingen Gång" ("There Goes My Everything") (Dallas Frazier, Stikkan Anderson) - 2:46
"Vi Är Alla Bara Barn I Början" (Benny Andersson, Björn Ulvaeus) - 3:12
"Kom Och Sjung En Sång" ("No Sad Song") (Carole King, Toni Stern, Stikkan Andersson) - 3:43

Bonus tracks (TV appearances and radio broadcasts 1970)
<LI>"Att Älska I Vårens Tid" (Gunnar Nystroem, Gösta Rybrant) - 2:41
<LI>"Ole Lukköje" (Ingrid Almqvist, Ingemar Malmström) - 1:50
<LI>"Vad Gör Det Att Vi Skiljs För I Afton" (Nils Jolinder, Karl-Ewert) - 2:18
<LI>"Min Soldat" (Nils Perne) - 2:30
<LI>"Barnen Sover" (Live) (Peter Himmelstrand) - 3:40

Production
 Olle Bergman - producer (CD1: tracks 1-12)
 Benny Andersson - producer (CD1: tracks 13-16, CD2: tracks 1-7, 10-13)
 Lars Berghagen - producer (CD2: tracks 8 & 9)
 CD2, tracks 14-17 from TV-show När Stenkakan Slog, Sveriges Radio 1970
 CD2, track 18 from radio show Våra Favoriter, Sveriges Radio 1970

References

Sources
http://pagesperso-orange.fr/tjm/abba/jmfrida.html

1997 compilation albums
Anni-Frid Lyngstad albums